Zərdab is a city in and the capital of the Zardab District of Azerbaijan.

Notable natives 
 Hasan bey Zardabi — publicist, founder of the first Azeri-language newspaper.

References

External links

World Gazetteer: Azerbaijan – World-Gazetteer.com

Populated places in Zardab District